is a passenger railway station located in the city of Matsusaka,  Mie Prefecture, Japan, operated by the private railway operator Kintetsu Railway.

Lines
Higashi-Matsusaka Station is served by the Yamada Line, and is located 10.0 rail kilometers from the terminus of the Yamada Line at Ise-Nakagawa Station.

Station layout
The station consists of two opposed side platforms connected by a level crossing. The station is unattended.

Platforms

Adjacent stations

History
Higashi-Matsusaka Station opened on March 27, 1930 as a station on the Sangu Express Electric Railway. On March 15, 1941, the line merged with Osaka Electric Railway to become a station on Kansai Express Railway's Yamada Line. This line in turn was merged with the Nankai Electric Railway on June 1, 1944 to form Kintetsu. The station was closed on June 1, 1945, but was reopened on March 14, 1946.

Passenger statistics
In fiscal 2019, the station was used by an average of 1101 passengers daily (boarding passengers only).

Surrounding area
Mie Chūkyō University
Matusaka High School
Mie High School

See also
List of railway stations in Japan

References

External links

 Kintetsu: Higashi-Matsusaka Station

Railway stations in Japan opened in 1930
Railway stations in Mie Prefecture
Stations of Kintetsu Railway
Matsusaka, Mie